The 1987–88 Kansas State Wildcats men's basketball team represented Kansas State University in the 1987-88 NCAA Division I men's basketball season. The head coach was Lon Kruger who was in his second of four years at the helm of his alma mater.  The Wildcats tied a then-school record with 25 wins and advanced to the Elite Eight of the NCAA Tournament.

The team played its home games in Ahearn Field House in Manhattan, Kansas.  It was the last season the team played in Ahearn Field House before moving into Bramlage Coliseum.  Kansas State was a member of the Big 8 Conference.

Roster

Starting line-up
This was the starting five for the last game of the regular season, against Missouri on March 5, 1988.

Class of 1987 recruits

Schedule

|-
!colspan=6 style=| Regular Season

|-
!colspan=6 style=| Big 8 Tournament

|-
!colspan=6 style=| NCAA Tournament

Source

Rankings

Awards and honors
Mitch Richmond – Consensus Second-team All-American

NBA Draft

References

Kansas State
Kansas State
Kansas State Wildcats men's basketball seasons
1987 in sports in Kansas
1988 in sports in Kansas